Pentila nero is a butterfly in the family Lycaenidae. It is found in the Republic of the Congo and possibly Cameroon. The habitat consists of forests.

References

Endemic fauna of the Republic of the Congo
Butterflies described in 1894
Poritiinae
Butterflies of Africa